Barbechat is a former commune in the Loire-Atlantique department in western France. On 1 January 2016, it was merged into the new commune of Divatte-sur-Loire.

Population

See also
Communes of the Loire-Atlantique department

References

External links

Official site

Former communes of Loire-Atlantique
Populated places disestablished in 2016